The Centre for Wildlife Gardening is a  nature reserve in Peckham in the London Borough of Southwark. It is owned by Southwark Council and managed by the London Wildlife Trust. It is a Site of Borough Importance for Nature Conservation, Grade I.

Formerly a council depot, the centre has a wildlife garden with a range of habitats, a nursery for wild flowers and raised beds for community use. There are other habitats such as a chalk bank with wild flowers, meadows, a woodland copse, a bog garden and a roof garden. There are two ponds with frogs, newts and dragonflies.

There is access at limited times.

References

Nature reserves in the London Borough of Southwark
London Wildlife Trust